Funn may refer to:

 Will Funn (born 1982), American former professional basketball player
 Mel Funn, a character in 1976 American satirical comedy film Silent Movie
 Research and Development Network in Norway (Forsknings og utviklingsnett i Norge, FUNN), a former network of computing centers in Norway
 Samuel Joseph Fünn (1819–1891), Hebrew writer and scholar

See also
 Fun (disambiguation)